Contraception is a monthly peer-reviewed medical journal covering reproductive medicine. It is published by Elsevier and was established in 1970. It is the official journal of the Association of Reproductive Health Professionals and the Society of Family Planning. The founding editor-in-chief was Daniel R. Mishell, Jr. (University of Southern California) and the current one is Carolyn Westhoff (Mailman School of Public Health). According to the Journal Citation Reports, the journal has a 2014 impact factor of 2.335, ranking it 23rd out of 79 journals in the category "Obstetrics & Gynecology".

References

External links 
 

Elsevier academic journals
Obstetrics and gynaecology journals
Monthly journals
Publications established in 1970
English-language journals